Bernard Georges-Marie Gavoty (2 April 1908 – 24 October 1981) was a 20th-century French organist, musicologist, music critic, and talk show host.

Biography 
Bernard Gavoty was born in 1908 to Raymond Gavoty (a deputy of the Var department; 11 March 1866 - 20 January 1937 in Paris) and Geneviève Magimel (9 October 1875 in Paris - 17 October 1946 ibid.) the 8th arrondissement of Paris; the capital city of France.

After being a pupil of Louis Vierne, Bernard Gavoty entered the Conservatoire de Paris where he had Denise Launay, Michel Boulnois, Antoine Reboulot, Félicien Wolff and Jean-Jacques Grunenwald, among others as classmates in the organ class.

He held a very special place among the students of Marcel Dupré at the Conservatoire. He was renowned as a brilliant speaker, endowed with being a refined writer. A great orator, he made numerous lectures, especially for the Jeunesses musicales de France, and was a famous French music critic for Le Figaro under the pseudonym Clarendon in reference to the main character of Beaumarchais's Eugénie.

In 1942, he was appointed the titular organist of the grand organ of the Église Saint-Louis des Invalides which he had rebuilt by the  company in the neoclassical style in 1955. In the 1950s and 1960s, he was frequently present on the single television channel to talk about classical music to its appreciators. In 1976, he was elected a member of the Académie des Beaux-Arts, where he succeeded Julien Cain in the free members section.

Personal life 
In 1944, Bernard Gavoty married Victoire Vignon (1916-2003). They had two daughters: Marie-Ange (born 1945) and Cécile (born 1949).

Gavoty passed away in the autumn of 1981 in the 7th arrondissement of Paris, aged 73.

Bibliography 
 Louis Vierne : La vie et l'œuvre, Paris, Albin Michel, 1943 ; new ed. 1979 
 Jehan Alain, musicien français, Paris, Albin Michel, 1945 ; reissued Éditions d'Aujourd'hui, coll. « Introuvables », 1985 
 Les Français sont-ils musiciens ?, éditions Conquistador, 1950  
 Deux capitales romantiques : Vienne Paris, Société française de diffusion musicale et artistique,1953
 Pour ou contre la musique nouvelle ?, with François Lesure, Flammarion
 Carl Schuricht, Geneva, series Les grands interprètes, René Kister, 1954
 Edwin Fischer, Geneva, series Les grands interprètes, René Kister, 1954
 Walter Gieseking, Geneva, series Les grands interprètes, René Kister, 1954 
 Wilhelm Kempff, Geneva, series Les grands interprètes, René Kister, 1954
 Roberto Benzi, Geneva, series Les grands interprètes, René Kister, 1954
 Alfred Cortot, Geneva, series Les grands interprètes, René Kister, 1955
 Pablo Casals, Geneva, series Les grands interprètes, René Kister, 1955 
 André Cluytens, Geneva, series Les grands interprètes, René Kister, 1955 
 Yehudi Menuhin et Georges Enesco , Geneva, series Les grands interprètes, René Kister, 1955 
 Arthur Rubinstein, Geneva, series Les grands interprètes, René Kister, 1955 
 Samson François, Geneva, series Les grands interprètes, René Kister, 1956 
 Wanda Landowska, Geneva, series Les grands interprètes, René Kister, 1956 
 Victoria de los Ángeles, Geneva, series Les grands interprètes, René Kister, 1956 
 Nathan Milstein, Geneva, series Les grands interprètes, René Kister, 1956 
 Bruno Walter Geneva, series Les grands interprètes, René Kister, 1956 
 Witold Malcuzynski, Geneva, series Les grands interprètes, René Kister, 1957 
 Elisabeth Schwarzkopf, Geneva, series Les grands interprètes, René Kister, 1957 
 La Musique adoucit les mœurs ?, Paris, Gallimard, 1959  
 Chopin amoureux, La Palatine, 1960  
 Dix grands musiciens, Gautier-Languereau, 1962  
 Vingt grands interprètes, Lausanne, Rencontres, 1966.
 Lettre d'Alexis Weissenberg à Bernard Gavoty, 1966
 L'Arme à gauche, Beauchesne, 1971  
 Chopin, Paris, Grasset, 1974
 Alfred Cortot, Paris, series Musique, Buchet/Chastel, 1977, rééd. 2012, 378 pages 
 Anicroches, Paris, series Musique », Buchet/Chastel, 1979, 245 pages, 
 Liszt, le virtuose, Paris, Julliard, 1980
 Les souvenirs de Georges Enesco, Kryos, 2006

 Discography 
 Camille Saint-Saëns - 3rd symphony, with organ (1975 - Paris, Égise Saint-Louis-des-Invalides - Orchestre National ORTF, conducted by Jean Martinon - EMI Group),
 Louis Vierne : Marche triomphale - César Franck : Prélude, Fugue et Variation - Claude Balbastre : développement sur le Noël populaire « Joseph est bien marié » (Paris, Saint-Louis-des-Invalides) - Erato, dq 105, 1957. Cuivres, dir. Louis Frémaux. Organ: Marcel Dupré),
  Prières à Saint-Louis-des-Invalides : Pierre de Bréville - Gabriel Fauré - Johann Sebastian Bach - César Franck (Paris, Saint-Louis-des-Invalides - Disque Ducretet, M.-R. Chauveau, soprano, 1958 (38),
 L'orgue de Saint-Louis-des-Invalides décrit par Bernard Gavoty (Paris, Saint-Louis-des-Invalides - Le Chant du Monde (éditions musicales et label), c. 1960),
Johann Sebastian Bach : les pièces cataloguées BWV 617, 645, 653, 659, 680, 686, 727, 734, 582, 541 (Paris, Saint-Louis-des-Invalides - Le Chant du Monde, 1963).

 Theatre 
 1971: Dumas le magnifique by Alain Decaux, directed by Julien Bertheau, Théâtre du Palais Royal
 1975: Les Secrets de la Comédie humaine'' by Félicien Marceau, directed by Paul-Émile Deiber, Théâtre du Palais Royal

References

External links 
 Éloge de Bernard Gavoty by Michel David-Weill lu à l'occasion de son installation comme membre de l'Académie des Beaux-Arts.
 Bernard Gavoty at Buchet/Chastel

Conservatoire de Paris alumni
French classical organists
French male organists
French art critics
French music critics
20th-century French musicologists
20th-century French journalists
Members of the Académie des beaux-arts
1908 births
Writers from Paris
1981 deaths
20th-century organists
20th-century French male musicians
20th-century classical musicians
Male classical organists